Ted Kosmatka is an American writer. His short stories have been reprinted in ten Year's Best anthologies, and he is co-winner of the 2010 Asimov's Readers' Choice Award.[3] His 2012 novel The Games was nominated for a Locus Award for Best First Novel.

Personal life
Kosmatka was born and raised in northwest Indiana where he worked for more than a decade in the steel industry.  After moving to Seattle with his family, he worked for several years as a video game writer before returning to the Midwest.

Bibliography

Novels
 The Games (2012)
 Prophet of Bones (2013)
 The Flicker Men (2015)

Video games
 Dota 2 (2013)
 Portal 2 (2011)

Short Speculative Fiction
 "The Beast Adjoins," The Best American Science Fiction & Fantasy 2021.
 "The One Who Isn't"  LIghtspeed Magazine.  July, 2016
 "The Stone War"  F&Sf, May, 2016
 "The Bewilderness of Lions"  Asimov's.  March, 2016
 "Chasing Ivory"  Asimov's.  Jan, 2016
 "Cry Room," Nightmare Magazine, Feb, 2013.
 "Haplotype 1402," Asimov's Science Fiction, July 2013
 "The Color Least Used by Nature," F&SF, Jan, 2012.
 "Escape He Done," Cemetery Dance Magazine, 2011.
 "In-fall" Lightspeed Magazine, December, 2010.
 "Blood Dauber," Asimov's, a collaboration with Michael Poore, Oct/Nov 2009.
 "Limited Penetrance, Variable Expression," The Human Genre Project, July 2009.
 "The Ascendant," Subterranean Online, Spring 2009.
 "Divining Light," Asimov's, 2008. 
 "The Art of Alchemy," Fantasy and Science Fiction, 2008.
 "N-words," Seeds of Change, J.J. Adams editor, 2008.
 "The Prophet of Flores," Asimov's, 2007.
 "Deadnauts," Ideomancer, 2007. 
 "Doxology," City Slab, 2007.
 "Bitterseed," Asimov's, 2006.
 "The God Engine," Asimov's Science Fiction, Oct-Nov 2005
 "Quicksilver," Spirits Magazine.
 "The Extinction of Ursus Theodorus," Deep Outside

Short Literary Fiction
 "Last Exit of Highway 94," Kindred Voices, 2006.
 "Indiana Harbor Jones," Workers' Anthology Audio CD, 2006.
 "Steel," Spirits Magazine.

Essays
 "Philip K. Dick the Shaman," Do Androids Dream of Electric Sheep #18, Boom Studios, 2010.

Plays
 Steel, a one act play

References

External links

 Official website
 Story behind Prophet of Bones - A World Where Creationists Were Right, a science thriller
 

Year of birth missing (living people)
Living people
21st-century American novelists
Valve Corporation people
Video game writers
American male novelists
American male short story writers
21st-century American short story writers
21st-century American male writers